Boniface Aggrey Agbonfo Guobadia (born 10 November 1926) was a Nigerian athlete. He competed in the men's high jump at the 1952 Summer Olympics.

References

External links
  

1926 births
Possibly living people
Athletes (track and field) at the 1952 Summer Olympics
Nigerian male high jumpers
Olympic athletes of Nigeria
Place of birth missing